Tamatoa is a name of Polynesian and Tahitian origin.

Notable people

Tamatoa Dynasty 

The Tamatoa Dynasty was a reigning dynasty of the island of Raiatea. Those with the name include:

 Tamatoa II, king of Raiatea and grandfather of Tamatoa III
 Tamatoa III (c. 1757 – 1831), king of Raiatea from 1820 to 1831
 Tamatoa IV (1797–1857), king of Raiatea from 1831 to 1857
 Tamatoa V (1842–1881), king of Raiatea and Taha'a from 1857 to 1871 (born Tamatoa-a-tu Pōmare)
 Tamatoa VI (1853–1905), king of Raiatea and Taha'a from 1885 to 1888
 Teriivaetua Tamatoa (1869–1918), member of the Pōmare Dynasty and daughter of Tamatoa V

Other people 
 Tamatoa Tetauira (born 1996), Tahitian footballer
 Tamatoa Wagemann (born 1980), Tahitian footballer
 John Tamatoa Baker (1852–1921), Hawaiian politician and businessman

Fictional characters 

 Tamatoa, a giant coconut crab from the 2016 film Moana
 Tamatoa, King of Bora Bora from the book Hawaii by James A. Michener, 1959

See also 
 Ngā Tamatoa, a New Zealand Māori activist group active in the 1970s

Polynesian given names